Notarcha aurolinealis is a species of moth of the family Crambidae. It is found in Hong Kong, Thailand and New South Wales and Queensland in Australia.

The wingspan is about 20 mm.

The larvae feed on Sida rhombifolia.

External links
 Australian caterpillars

Moths described in 1859
Spilomelinae